Willowbrook, alternatively named Willow Brook, is an unincorporated community and census-designated place (CDP) in Los Angeles County, California. The population was 24,295 at the 2020 census, down from 35,983 at the 2010 census.

Willowbrook is the home to the newly renovated  Martin Luther King Jr. Outpatient Center. Also located in Willowbrook is the Charles R. Drew University of Medicine and Science, which oversees residency training programs, allied health programs, a medical education program (jointly with the University of California, Los Angeles), a medical magnet high school, the area Head Start program, and various centers for health disparities research. Due to severe deficiencies, the former King/Drew Medical Center lost accreditation of several key residency training programs.

History

Long before the name "Willowbrook" was given, willows and a slow, shallow brook separated this portion of the Los Angeles plain from the rest of it. The original rancho boundary of the 1840s was a lone, streamside willow tree along the present intersection of 125th Street and Mona Boulevard.

In the early days, springs were abundant in Willowbrook. Winter rains brought up fine ryegrass stands between gravelly ridges left by the long-ago floods of the Los Angeles River. Anastacio Avila was grazing cattle on the land as early as 1820. The Mexican governor had granted him  acres by 1843. The grant was called Rancho La Tajauta, and it extended from the marshes along present Alameda Street westward to approximately the present line of the Harbor Freeway. Within the area covered by Rancho La Tajauta is all of present-day Willowbrook.

In 1894 and 1895, the first subdivisions in the Willowbrook area were registered along what is now Rosecrans Avenue. The name of Willowbrook was first formally used when Willowbrook Tract was recorded by the County Recorder in 1903. Next to the tract was the recently opened Pacific Electric Railway to Long Beach. There is no indication that a townsite had been envisioned and that street patterns were not synchronized. The Willowbrook name came into use for the entire area, because Pacific Electric Railroad Company's Big Red Cars stopped at Willowbrook's 126th Street.

In Willowbrook, lot purchasers expected to live a definitely suburban life. The deep lots, sometimes 300 feet or 91 meters in depth, attracted working-class families, especially newcomers to Southern California. The Big Red Cars offered fast and convenient transport to shops in downtown Los Angeles and jobs in port areas of Long Beach and San Pedro. During the Depression years, residents used the land behind their homes to cultivate fruits and vegetables, run hogs, and raise chickens. This use of land, along with the vacant lots filled with mustard plants, enhanced the rural appearance of the area. Increased suburban growth occurred in Willowbrook after the end of the Depression and World War II, but not so much that the agricultural character of the area was drastically modified. Even the Watts Riots of 1965 did not change that, although Willowbrook had a variety of buildings, including the community library of Willowbrook, damaged.

The blend of agricultural and residential land use persisted at Willowbrook into the early 1980s, when a redevelopment plan drawn up by the Watts Labor Community Action Committee from 1965 to 1993 and funded by Los Angeles County caused the area to lose its rural character.  acres of Willowbrook land were redeveloped under this plan to include new commercial and residential facilities. The appearance of present-day Willowbrook is similar to other communities in the South Central section of Los Angeles because of this.

Geography
Willowbrook is located at  (33.917515, -118.252705).

Demographics

2010
At the 2010 census Willowbrook had a population of 35,983. The racial makeup of Willowbrook was 8,245 (22.9%) White (0.9% Non-Hispanic White), 12,387 (34.4%) African American, 273 (0.8%) Native American, 119 (0.3%) Asian, 49 (0.1%) Pacific Islander, 13,858 (38.5%) from other races, and 1,052 (2.9%) from two or more races. Hispanic or Latino of any race were 22,979 persons (63.9%).

The census reported that 35,577 people (98.9% of the population) lived in households, 116 (0.3%) lived in non-institutionalized group quarters, and 290 (0.8%) were institutionalized.

There were 8,721 households, 4,920 (56.4%) had children under the age of 18 living in them, 3,626 (41.6%) were opposite-sex married couples living together, 2,635 (30.2%) had a female householder with no husband present, 859 (9.8%) had a male householder with no wife present.  There were 640 (7.3%) unmarried opposite-sex partnerships, and 38 (0.4%) same-sex married couples or partnerships. 1,336 households (15.3%) were one person and 585 (6.7%) had someone living alone who was 65 or older. The average household size was 4.08.  There were 7,120 families (81.6% of households); the average family size was 4.38.

The age distribution was 11,790 people (32.8%) under the age of 18, 4,500 people (12.5%) aged 18 to 24, 9,595 people (26.7%) aged 25 to 44, 7,200 people (20.0%) aged 45 to 64, and 2,898 people (8.1%) who were 65 or older.  The median age was 28.2 years. For every 100 females, there were 92.1 males.  For every 100 females age 18 and over, there were 89.2 males.

There were 9,600 housing units at an average density of 2,546.3 per square mile, of the occupied units 4,525 (51.9%) were owner-occupied and 4,196 (48.1%) were rented. The homeowner vacancy rate was 2.5%; the rental vacancy rate was 5.9%.  19,021 people (52.9% of the population) lived in owner-occupied housing units and 16,556 people (46.0%) lived in rental housing units.

According to the 2010 United States Census, Willowbrook had a median household income of $34,005, with 31.5% of the population living below the federal poverty line.

2000
At the 2000 census there were 34,138 people, 8,476 households, and 6,823 families in the CDP. The population density was 9,121.6 inhabitants per square mile (3,524.3/km). The racial makeup of the CDP was 16.06% White, 44.91% African American, 0.72% Native American, 0.27% Asian, 0.13% Pacific Islander, 34.98% from other races, and 2.94% from two or more races. Hispanic or Latino of any race were 53.60%.

Of the 8,476 households 47.8% had children under the age of 18 living with them, 42.5% were married couples living together, 29.9% had a female householder with no husband present, and 19.5% were non-families. 16.1% of households were one person and 7.8% were one person aged 65 or older.  The average household size was 3.97 and the average family size was 4.35.

The age distribution was 37.3% under the age of 18, 10.9% from 18 to 24, 28.4% from 25 to 44, 14.7% from 45 to 64, and 8.7% 65 or older.  The median age was 26 years. For every 100 females, there were 93.3 males.  For every 100 females age 18 and over, there were 87.6 males.

The median household income was $27,811 and the median family income  was $30,107. Males had a median income of $22,250 versus $23,615 for females. The per capita income for the CDP was $9,865.  About 26.8% of families and 30.7% of the population were below the poverty line, including 39.5% of those under age 18 and 16.8% of those age 65 or over.

Government

Infrastructure
The Los Angeles County Sheriff's Department (LASD) operates the Century Station in Lynwood, serving Willowbrook.

The United States Postal Service Willowbrook Post Office is located at 2241 East El Segundo Boulevard in the CDP.

Martin Luther King, Jr. Community Hospital, replacing the King Drew Hospital − Martin Luther King, Jr. Multi-Service Ambulatory Care Center in 2015,  is located in Willowbrook. The Charles R. Drew University of Medicine and Science and King Drew Magnet High School of Medicine and Science are adjacent.

Transportation

Metro Rail station and lines

The Willowbrook/Rosa Parks station is a major hub Los Angeles County Metro Rail station on the A Line and C Line.  The station is located in the Century Freeway (Interstate 105) median, above the intersection of Imperial Highway and Wilmington Avenue in the Willowbrook. It is a major transfer point for commuters.

As a major transfer station, Willowbrook/Rosa Parks Station also acts as a major bus hub, serving many bus routes operated by LA Metro and other regional/municipal transit agencies.  The station also has park and ride facilities, including 975 parking spaces and 4 bike lockers.  To the east of the station is the Metro Rail Operations Center, which is the dispatch hub for all Metro Rail trains.

Metro Bus routes
The Los Angeles County Metropolitan Transportation Authority (LA Metro) provides Metro Local bus services to and from the Willowbrook area.

The Los Angeles County Department of Public Works also operates two shuttle services that serve the Willowbrook area:
Hahn's Trolley and Shuttle Service
Rosewood Smart Shuttle.
Willowbrook Link

Education

Colleges and universities
Charles R. Drew University of Medicine and Science is located in Willowbrook.

Primary and secondary schools
Most residents are zoned to schools in the Compton Unified School District. Zoned elementary schools within the CDP include Anderson, Carver, Jefferson, King, and Lincoln. Bunche Middle School, Willowbrook Middle School and Centennial High School are located outside of the CDP in Compton. Cesar Chavez Continuation High School is in Willowbrook.

Avalon Gardens Elementary School, in Willowbrook, serves the LAUSD areas. Residents of the LAUSD areas continue to  Locke High School in Watts. Banneker Special Education Center, a special LAUSD school, and King Drew Magnet High School of Medicine and Science, an LAUSD magnet school, are in Willowbrook.

Public libraries
LA County Library operates the Willowbrook Library at 11737 Wilmington Ave. inside the CDP.

Parks and recreation
Los Angeles County operates area parks.

The  George Washington Carver Park (previously Willowbrook Neighborhood Park) has a lighted baseball field, an arts and crafts room, a "Nike GO" outdoor basketball court, a community room, a lighted softball field, a multipurpose field, a multipurpose room, picnic areas with barbecue pits, and a swimming pool.

Earvin "Magic" Johnson County Recreation Area, a  park, mostly in Willowbrook and partially in Los Angeles, has play areas for children, picnic areas with barbecue pits, two fishing lakes, soccer fields, toilet facilities, and walking paths.

The California Office of Environmental Health Hazard Assessment has issued a safe eating advisory for any fish caught in Magic Mike Lakes due to elevated levels of mercury and PCBs.

Enterprise County Park, a  park located in the Rosewood neighborhood in Willowbrook, has an athletic field, a lighted baseball/softball diamond, a community recreation room, a gymnasium, a multi-purpose field, picnic areas with barbecue pits, and a swimming pool.

Athens Park, a  park, within the Athens Village area and in Willowbrook, has two lighted baseball/softball diamonds, a basketball court, children's play areas, a community recreation multipurpose room, a computer lab, a gymnasium, a multi-purpose field, picnic areas with barbecue pits, a swimming pool, tennis courts, and toilet facilities. Mona County Park, an  park, has a lighted baseball/softball diamond, an outdoor basketball court, a children's play area, a community room, a gymnasium, a shaded picnic shelter, a swimming pool, and the Tiny Tot Learning Center.

See also

 Willowbrook/Rosa Parks (Los Angeles Metro station)
 South Los Angeles

References

External links
Rotary Club of Watts-Willowbrook

 
Census-designated places in Los Angeles County, California
Unincorporated communities in Los Angeles County, California
South Los Angeles
Populated places established in 1903
1903 establishments in California
Census-designated places in California
Unincorporated communities in California